{{DISPLAYTITLE:C14H20O4}}
The molecular formula C14H20O4 (molar mass: 252.31 g/mol) may refer to:

 3,4-Epoxycyclohexylmethyl-3’,4’-epoxycyclohexane carboxylate (ECC)
 Sch 642305

Molecular formulas